The British Adriatic Squadron, or simply the Adriatic Squadron and later known as the British Adriatic Force, was a military formation of the Mediterranean Fleet during World War I based at Taranto from 1915–19.

History
In May 1915 Italy entered the war aligning itself with allied powers against the Central Powers, becoming involved in the  Adriatic Campaign of World War I. But due to a lack of coordination with the French Naval Command by the Italians, the British decided to enforce an allied agreement by establishing a British Adriatic Squadron to be based at Taranto. Between July and September 1917 the Mediterranean Fleet was reorganised following coordination between other allied powers. Britain's scope of geographic responsibility to include new sub commands would encompass the Adriatic Sea, Aegean Sea, Coast of Egypt, Gibraltar and the waters around Malta. Following command changes in August 1917 the squadron was downgraded and renamed the British Adriatic Force.

Commanders
Post holders included:

References

External links
 DreadnoughtProject.org page on the formation

Sources
 Halpern, Paul G. (2004). The Battle of the Otranto Straits: Controlling the Gateway to the Adriatic in World War I. Bloomington, Indiana USA: Indiana University Press. .
 Harley, Simon; Lovell, Tony (2015). "Adriatic Squadron (Royal Navy) - The Dreadnought Project". www.dreadnoughtproject.org. Harley and Lovell. 
 Marder, Arthur J. (2014). "2:Offensive in the Adriatic". From the Dreadnought to Scapa Flow[electronic resource] (revised ed.). Barnsley, England: Seaforth Publishing. .
 Sondhaus, Lawrence (2014). The Great War at Sea: A Naval History of the First World War. Cambridge, England: Cambridge University Press. .
 Watson, Dr Graham (2015). "Royal Navy Organisation and Ship Deployment, World War One 1914-1918:THE MEDITERRANEAN". www.naval-history.net. Gordon Smith.

Royal Navy squadrons
Military units and formations established in 1915
Military units and formations disestablished in 1919